Frank Bailey (2 August 1907 – 1969) was an English professional association footballer who played as a wing-half. Between 1925 and 1928, he played four matches in the Football League for Nelson.

References

1907 births
1969 deaths
Footballers from Burnley
English footballers
Association football wing halves
Nelson F.C. players
Great Harwood F.C. players
Lancaster City F.C. players
Rossendale United F.C. players
Morecambe F.C. players
English Football League players